Adyghe State University is a university located in Maykop, Adyghe Republic, Russian Federation. It is a leading educational and research center in the republic. The rector is Daud Mamiy.

History 
The university was founded in 1940, first as Adyghe State Pedagogical Institute. It was officially recognized as a state university in 1993.

Structure

Institutes 
 Institute of Arts
 Institute of Physical Culture and Judo ASU|Institute of Physical Culture and Judo
 Science Research Institute

Faculties 
 Mathematics and Computer Science
 Adyghe Philology and Culture
 Natural
 Engineering Physics
 Foreign Languages
 History
 International
 Pedagogy and Psychology
 Philological
 Economic
 Legal
 Social Technologies and Tourism

External links 

Maykop
Buildings and structures in Adygea
Universities in Russia